Adam Jack Aubrey Wheater (born 13 February 1990) is a former English first-class cricketer who played for Essex. He was a right-handed batsman who also played as a wicket-keeper.

Career

Wheater made two appearances in the non-first-class Pro ARCH Trophy in March 2008 against the United Arab Emirates, and made his first-class debut for Essex against Cambridge UCCE the following month.

Wheater spent the first few seasons of his professional career at Essex as understudy to James Foster. Coincidentally, Foster and Wheater were both born in Leytonstone.

Wheater spent the winter of 2010/11 playing for Zimbabwean franchise Matabeleland Tuskers. He made his maiden first-class century for the Tuskers during his spell. On his return, he was picked as a specialist batsman twice in CB40 games for Essex with Foster in the same team. Wheater fielded at slip or point while Foster, being the senior and superior gloveman, kept wicket.

Frustrated with his lack of wicket-keeping opportunities at Essex, he bought himself out of his contract and moved to Hampshire.
There he had a new battle for the gloves, as Michael Bates was a highly rated keeper. Wheater once again found himself sometimes playing as a specialist batsman. After a spell as first-choice wicket-keeper he once again found himself in a battle, this time with Lewis McManus. He then returned to Essex, even though James Foster was still there. He was only sure of his position as first-choice keeper once Foster retired at the end of the 2018 season.

In May 2022, Essex County Cricket Club announced that Adam Wheater is scheduled to retire after the 2022 season.

References

External links 
.

1990 births
Living people
English cricketers
Essex cricketers
Matabeleland cricketers
Badureliya Sports Club cricketers
Northern Districts cricketers
Hampshire cricketers
Cambridge MCCU cricketers
Wicket-keepers